Astrothelium aurantiacocinereum is a species of corticolous (bark-dwelling), crustose lichen in the family Trypetheliaceae. It occurs in New Caledonia.

Taxonomy
The lichen was formally described as a new species in 2016 by Robert Lücking, Khwanruan Naksuwankul, and H. Thorsten Lumbsch. The species epithet alludes to the colour contrast between the orange  and the grey thallus.

Description
The photobiont partner of the lichen is in an endoperidermal layer (the inner of the two layers of the peridium), suggesting a low degree of lichenisation. The ascomata are in the form of perithecia, which occur in aggregated groups of 5–20 in pseudostromata. These structures are covered with a carbonised (blackened) layer that is topped by an orange pigment layer. Ascospores number eight per ascus and have a spindle-shaped to ellipsoid shape; their dimensions are 22–27 by 8–10 μm.

The characteristics of the lichen that distinguish it from others in genus Astrothelium are the barely lichenized, grey thallus; and the distinctly pseudostromatic ascomata, with prominent to sessile pseudostromata, with an orange cover that strongly contrasts with thallus. Astrothelium aeneum is somewhat similar in appearance, but this lookalike differs from A. aurantiacocinereum in the degree of lichenisation, the form of the pseudostromata, and the presence of pigment on the surface of the thallus.

References

aurantiacocinereum
Lichen species
Lichens described in 2016
Lichens of New Caledonia
Taxa named by Robert Lücking